David Armitage (born 1965) is a British historian who has written on international and intellectual history. He is chair of the history department and Lloyd C. Blankfein Professor of History at Harvard University.

Life and career 

Armitage was born in Stockport, England and educated at Stockport Grammar School before attending St Catharine's College, Cambridge, where he read English as an undergraduate. After receiving his BA, he embarked on a PhD in English, initially intending to write his doctoral dissertation on Shakespeare's classical sources and the English neoclassical poets. During the course of his research, he became interested in the relationship between republicanism and empire in the works of John Milton and was increasingly attracted to the discipline of intellectual history. Funded by a Harkness Fellowship, he took two years off from his PhD to retrain as a historian at Princeton's Institute for Advanced Study. He was awarded his doctorate in history from Cambridge in 1992 with his dissertation The British empire and the civic tradition, 1656–1742, a study of the relationship between English literature and Britain's imperial ventures in the Americas.

After completing his PhD, Armitage remained at Cambridge until 1993 as a junior research fellow at Emmanuel College. He then joined the history faculty at Columbia University during which time he spent 2000 and 2001 at Harvard University on a fellowship. He joined the faculty of Harvard in 2004, later becoming the Lloyd C. Blankfein Professor of History and Chair of the Department of History. In 2008 Harvard named him a Walter Channing Cabot Fellow for "achievements and scholarly eminence in the fields of literature, history or art". He is a Fellow of the Royal Society of Edinburgh, the Royal Historical Society and the Australian Academy of the Humanities.

Armitage has written about Atlantic history, digital humanities and Big History.

Armitage was married to Harvard history professor Joyce Chaplin.

Books
The Ideological Origins of the British Empire (Cambridge University Press, 2000)
Greater Britain, 1516–1776: Essays in Atlantic History (Ashgate, 2004)
The Declaration of Independence: A Global History (Harvard University Press, 2007)
Foundations of Modern International Thought (Cambridge University Press, 2012)
The History Manifesto (with Jo Guldi, Cambridge University Press, 2014)
Civil Wars: A History in Ideas (Penguin Random House, 2017)

Edited volumes
Milton and Republicanism (with Armand Himy and Quentin Skinner, Cambridge University Press, 1995)
Bolingbroke: Political Writings (Cambridge University Press, 1997)
Theories of Empire, 1450–1800 (Ashgate, 1998)
The British Atlantic World, 1500–1800 (with Michael Braddick, Palgrave Macmillan, 2002)
British Political Thought in History, Literature and Theory, 1500–1800 (Cambridge University Press, 2006)
 Shakespeare and Early Modern Political Thought (with Conal Condren and Andrew Fitzmaurice, Cambridge University Press, 2009)
The Age of Revolutions in Global Context, c. 1760–1840 (with Sanjay Subrahmanyam, Palgrave 2010)
 Pacific Histories: Ocean, Land, People (with Alison Bashford, Palgrave, 2014)
 A Cultural History of Peace in the Age of Enlightenment (with Stella Ghervas, Bloomsbury Academic, 2020)

References

External links
Faculty page at Harvard University
 "Eating One’s Own: Examining Civil War – A Conversation with David Armitage", Ideas Roadshow, 2017

Alumni of St Catharine's College, Cambridge
British historians
Historians of the British Isles
Historians of colonialism
Harvard Fellows
Columbia University faculty
1965 births
Living people
Historians of political thought
Harkness Fellows